London Labour is the devolved, regional part of the Labour Party in Greater London. It is the largest political party in London, currently holding a majority of the executive mayoralties, a majority of local councils, council seats and parliamentary seats, and a plurality of assembly seats.

Current representatives

Members of Parliament 

Shadow Cabinet
 Keir Starmer – Leader of the Opposition, Leader of the Labour Party
 David Lammy – Shadow Lord Chancellor and Shadow Secretary of State for Justice
 Emily Thornberry – Shadow Secretary of State for International Trade
 Steve Reed – Shadow Secretary of State for Communities and Local Government

Shadow Ministers
 Rosena Allin-Khan – Shadow Minister for Mental Health (attending Shadow Cabinet)

London Assembly Members

Councillors

Common Councilmen

Labour is the only political party to have any seats in the City of London Corporation's Court of Common Council.

Directly-elected Mayors

Electoral performance

UK Parliament elections

The table below shows the London Labour Party's results at UK general elections since the area of Greater London was created.

European Parliament elections

The table below shows the results gained by the London Labour Party in elections to the European Parliament. From 1979 to 1994, MEPs were elected from 10 individual constituencies by first-past-the-post; since 1999, MEPs were elected from a London-wide regional list by proportional representation.

Regional elections

Greater London Council elections

The table below shows the results obtained by the London Labour Party in elections to the Greater London Council. The GLC was abolished by the Local Government Act 1985.

Between 1986 and 2000 there was no city-wide governmental body in Greater London.

London Assembly elections

The table below shows the results obtained by the London Labour Party in elections to the London Assembly.

London Mayoral elections

The table below shows the London Labour Party's results in elections for the Mayor of London.

Borough council elections

The table below shows the London Labour Party's results in elections for the London Boroughs.

References

External links
 
 City Hall Labour
 
 Your Councillors

 
Democratic socialism
Social democratic parties in the United Kingdom
Politics of London